Lange is a northern suburb of Albany in southern Western Australia, north of Albany's central business district. Its local government area is the City of Albany. The population of the suburb has a median age of 39 years.

References

Suburbs of Albany, Western Australia